Angelica pubescens is a plant in the family Apiaceae, native to Japan and China. The Japanese common name is shishiudo and the Chinese common name is 猪独活, du huo.

It is a herbaceous perennial plant growing to 1–2 m tall with tripinnate leaves up to 1 m long, the leaflets being 5–10 cm long. The flowers are white, produced in large umbels.

The young stems and leaves are edible. Shishiudo is often mistaken with udo. The plant is used in traditional Chinese medicine.

References 

pubescens
Plants used in traditional Chinese medicine